Mawlavi Abdullah Qarluq is an Afghan politician and former governor of Takhar Province. He also has served as senator of Kunduz in the Meshrano Jirga. Qarluq was appointed governor on 27 September 2020 and was governor while Taloqan, the provincial capital, was attacked by the Taliban as part of the 2021 Taliban offensive. The city later fell to the Taliban.

References 

Governors of Takhar Province
Living people
Members of the House of Elders (Afghanistan)
People from Kunduz Province
1970s births